John Philip Saklil (20 March 1960 – 3 August 2019) was an Indonesian prelate of the  Catholic Church who was Bishop of Timika from 2004 until his death in 2019.

Saklil was born in Kokonao, Netherlands New Guinea, on 20 March 1960. He studied in Indonesia and the Philippines before being ordained a priest of the Diocese of Jayapura on 23 October 1988. He fulfilled pastoral assignments until 1993 and then studied for three years at the East Asian Pastoral Institute in Manila. Returning to Jayapura, he was vicar general from 1996 to 1999 and then episcopal vicar for the western part of the diocese, based in Timika, from 2000 to 2004.

On 10 January 2004, Pope John Paul II appointed him the first Bishop of newly established Diocese of Timika. He received his episcopal consecration on 18 April.

He died on 3 August 2019.

References

1960 births
2019 deaths
People from Mimika Regency
Papuan people
21st-century Roman Catholic bishops in Indonesia